Art of Revenge is a 2003 drama thriller film written and directed by Simon Gormick. The film was released straight to video, starring Joyce Hyser and Stephan Jenkins of Third Eye Blind.

Plot
When Matthew Kane (Stephan Jenkins) becomes a successful architect, he leaves his wife of seven years, Lara (Joyce Hyser), to nurture his newfound taste for younger and prettier women. Bent on revenge, Lara hires  a beautiful con artist named Tuesday (Nichole Hiltz) to seduce and emotionally destroy her ex-husband. When the two women become more involved with Matt as well as each other, a story of loyalty, vengeance, and betrayal begins to unfold as the situation becomes more dangerous than expected for all parties involved.

Cast
 Stephan Jenkins as Matthew Kane
 Joyce Hyser as Lara Kane
 Nicole Hiltz as Tuesday Arcatur
 Tembi Locke as Isabel "Izzy" Bloom
 David DeLuise as Benjamin Bloom
 Tony Denison as John Ravich

Reception
Writing for The A.V. Club, Nathan Rabin referred to the film as "hilariously awful," specifically criticizing Jenkins's "inexplicably effeminate performance that throws the film off balance."

References

External links
 

2003 films